Starring Bert Lytell, The Right of Way is a lost 1920 American remade silent film directed by John Francis Dillon and distributed by Metro Pictures. The film was previously filmed in 1915 and released on February 29, 1920 in the United States.

Cast

References

External links

1920 films
American silent feature films
Lost American films
Films directed by John Francis Dillon
Films based on Canadian novels
Films based on works by Gilbert Parker
Remakes of American films
American black-and-white films
Metro Pictures films
1920 lost films
1920s American films